Deputy Attorney General of Tanzania is the principal assistant in the discharge of functions and duties of the Attorney General of Tanzania as may be assigned by the Attorney General of Tanzania. The post is a constitutional oriented position and appointment is made by the President of the United Republic of Tanzania in subject to Article (59A) of the Constitution of the United Republic of Tanzania, 1977.
The post of Deputy Attorney General of the United Republic of Tanzania was established in 1961.
Generally, the functions of the Deputy Attorney General of the United Republic of Tanzania is to execute the day to a day activities of the Attorney General's Chamber of the United Republic of Tanzania.

List of the Deputy Attorneys General of Tanzania

References 

Tanzanian lawyers